Canale is a popular Italian surname. The name is thought to have originated in various parts of Northern Italy and its literal English translation is "Canal", which means waterway. Italian surnames were often taken from places of residence, such as a town or village. Names were also derived from landmarks, which could explain the Canale name. Persons with this surname include:

 Gianna Maria Canale (b. 1927), Italian Actress
 Giuseppe Canale (1725−1802), Italian painter and engraver
 Gonzalo Canale, Italian rugby player
 Jos Canale, Canadian ice hockey coach
 Michele Giuseppe Canale (1808−1890), Italian historian
 George Canale, Major League Baseball player

Italian-language surnames